Jeremy Crawford is a game designer who has worked primarily on role-playing games. He is most widely known for being the Lead Rules Designer for Wizards of the Coast.

Career
Jeremy Crawford co-designed and edited the Blue Rose role-playing game along with Steve Kenson (2005).

He was hired by Wizards of the Coast in 2007 as a game designer for their flagship Dungeons & Dragons product, and has worked there since then. His Dungeons & Dragons design credits include Player's Handbook 2 (2009), Dungeon Master's Kit (2010), and Heroes of the Fallen Lands (2010).

He was the rules manager for the 4th Edition of Dungeons & Dragons. Development on a new edition started in 2011 and Crawford became the Co-Lead Designer, along with Mike Mearls, of the 5th Edition of Dungeons & Dragons. Crawford also became the lead rules developer and managing editor of the edition. Under Crawford and Mearls, there became a concerted effort to boost inclusiveness both in the game and in the development of the game. The 5th Edition version of the game credits women as contributors to its design more than any previous one: about 26 percent are female, as opposed to 20 percent in 4th Edition and 12 percent in 3rd Edition. He is credited as one of the authors of the Player's Handbook for the 5th edition of Dungeons & Dragons, along with several other books in the edition. He also authors the monthly "Sage Advice" newsletter.

Personal life
Crawford is openly gay, and married his husband Phillip Lienau in 2014.

Works

References

External links
 
RPGGeek RPG Designer Page: Jeremy Crawford

American LGBT people
Dungeons & Dragons game designers
Living people
Year of birth missing (living people)